Asia Muhammad and Yasmin Schnack were the defending champions, having won the event in 2012, but both decided not to defend the title together as a team. Muhammad partnered up with Maria Sanchez as the first seeds whilst Schnack received a wildcard with Kelly Wilson. Schnack and Wilson lost in the first round; Muhammad and Schnack lost in the quarterfinals.

Naomi Broady and Storm Sanders won the title, defeating Robin Anderson and Lauren Embree in the final, 6–3, 6–4.

Seeds

Draw

References 
 Draw

FSP Gold River Women's Challenger - Doubles
FSP Gold River Women's Challenger